Maurice Patrick "Mossy" Hynes (29 September 1886 – 27 March 1939) was an Australian politician.

He worked in northern and western Queensland as a railway worker, stockman and waterfront labourer before moving to Mackay where he became a sugar industry worker.

He was the Labor member for Townsville in the Legislative Assembly of Queensland from 1923 to 1939. He was also Secretary of Labour and Industry from 1932 to 1939 in William Forgan Smith's government.

Hynes died in 1939. He was accorded a state funeral which proceeded from St Stephen's Cathedral to the Toowong Cemetery.

References

1886 births
1939 deaths
Members of the Queensland Legislative Assembly
Place of birth missing
Burials at Toowong Cemetery
Australian Labor Party members of the Parliament of Queensland
20th-century Australian politicians
Australian waterside workers